Dorsum Buckland is a large wrinkle ridge at  in Mare Serenitatis on the Moon, 369 km long.  It was named after British geologist William Buckland in 1976.

Dorsum Buckland's ridges are 200 to 300 meters high and were formed by compressional stresses near the center of the basin, possibly over buried basin structures.

References

External links

LAC-42
LTO-41C2 Galen, Lunar Topographic Orthophotomap (shows northwestern Dorsum Buckland)
LTO-42D1 Hornsby, Lunar Topographic Orthophotomap (shows southeastern Dorsum Buckland)
Dorsum Buckland at The Moon Wiki
Buckland Boulders, a Lunar Reconnaissance Orbiter article

Buckland
Mare Serenitatis